Paul Omba-Biongolo (born 28 December 1995) is a French heavyweight boxer. He competed at the 2016 Olympics, but was eliminated in his first bout by Abdulkadir Abdullayev of Azerbaijan.

References

External links

 
 
 
 

1995 births
Living people
Heavyweight boxers
French male boxers
Olympic boxers of France
Boxers at the 2016 Summer Olympics
Mediterranean Games bronze medalists for France
Competitors at the 2018 Mediterranean Games
Sportspeople from Vienne, Isère
Mediterranean Games medalists in boxing
Boxers at the 2015 European Games
European Games competitors for France